Edit Kovács (born 9 June 1954, Veszprém) is a Hungarian fencer, who won three Olympic medals in the foil team competitions. She graduated from the Physical Education College in 1986. She became the senior inspector of the Hungarian Fencing Association, then she was secretary general between 1991 and 2001.

References

External links
 Nemzeti Sportszövetség (National Sports Association) 

1954 births
Living people
Hungarian female foil fencers
Fencers at the 1976 Summer Olympics
Fencers at the 1980 Summer Olympics
Fencers at the 1988 Summer Olympics
Olympic fencers of Hungary
Olympic bronze medalists for Hungary
Olympic medalists in fencing
Medalists at the 1976 Summer Olympics
Medalists at the 1980 Summer Olympics
Medalists at the 1988 Summer Olympics
People from Veszprém
Sportspeople from Veszprém County
20th-century Hungarian women